Allan John Greenshields (22 January 1926 – 28 June 2016) was an Australian rules footballer who played for Carlton and St Kilda in the VFL.

Although recruited from Pascoe Vale, Greenshields had also played football in Coburg prior to arriving at Carlton. He was a reserve in Carlton's 1947 premiership team but did not take the field during the game, and was a reserve in all but three of his games while with Carlton. Greenshields played more when he crossed to St Kilda, being used mainly as a half back flanker.

References

Blueseum: Allan Greenshields
Allan Greenshields' obituary

1926 births
2016 deaths
Australian rules footballers from Victoria (Australia)
Carlton Football Club players
Carlton Football Club Premiership players
St Kilda Football Club players
Pascoe Vale Football Club players
One-time VFL/AFL Premiership players